Indore Institute of Science and Technology, Indore is a college in Indore Madhya Pradesh, India. It was established in 2003. It is affiliated to Rajiv Gandhi Proudyogiki Vishwavidyalaya (RGPV) for B Tech in CS/ECE/IT/ME/CM/CE and ME in Computer Science/Digital Communication/Machine Design, B Pharm and M Pharm courses and Devi Ahilya Vishwavidyalaya (DAVV) for BBA (FT), BCom, B.Sc. (Maths, Stats, Comp Science), BA(Hons) Economics and Master of Business Administration (MBA) courses.

The institute also offers undergraduate and postgraduate programs in various engineering disciplines such as Computer Science and Engineering, Electronics and Communication Engineering, Mechanical Engineering, Civil Engineering, and Information Technology.

References

External links

Educational institutions established in 2003
Engineering colleges in Madhya Pradesh
2003 establishments in Madhya Pradesh